Jean-Paul Olinger (born 17 March 1943) is a Luxembourgian fencer. He competed in the team foil event at the 1960 Summer Olympics.

References

External links
 

1943 births
Living people
Luxembourgian male foil fencers
Olympic fencers of Luxembourg
Fencers at the 1960 Summer Olympics
Sportspeople from Luxembourg City